Idionyx is a genus of dragonflies in the family Synthemistidae, which is earlier treated as a subfamily of Corduliidae. According to World Odonata List, this genera is best considered incertae sedis.

The genus consists of the following species:

References

Synthemistidae
Anisoptera genera
Taxa named by Hermann August Hagen